At least two ships of the French Navy have been named Bordelais:

 , a  launched in 1928 and scuttled in 1942.
 , a  launched in 1953 and scrapped in 1981.

French Navy ship names